Ceblepyris is a genus of African passerine birds in the cuckooshrike family Campephagidae.

These species were formerly placed in the genus Coracina. A molecular phylogenetic study published in 2010 found that Coracina, as then defined, was non-monophyletic. In the resulting reorganization to create monophyletic genera these species were moved to the resurrected genus Ceblepyris.

The genus contains the following five species:

 Madagascar cuckooshrike (Ceblepyris cinereus)
 Comoros cuckooshrike (Ceblepyris cucullatus)
 Grauer's cuckooshrike (Ceblepyris graueri)
 White-breasted cuckooshrike (Ceblepyris pectoralis)
 Grey cuckooshrike (Ceblepyris caesius)

References

 
Bird genera
Taxa named by Georges Cuvier